Saucer Attack! is a shoot 'em up written by James D. Sachs for the Commodore 64 and published by Sachs Enterprises in 1984. The goal is to protect Washington, D.C. from invading flying saucers.

Gameplay

The game presents a backdrop of Washington, with various landmarks such as the Washington Monument visible. Flying saucers descend from the top of the screen. The player has to move a crosshair at the saucers and fire bullets to destroy them. If allowed to proceed unharmed, saucers will hover near a famous landmark and shoot a beam of electricity at it, eventually destroying it. If all landmarks are destroyed, the game is lost.

Reception

References

1984 video games
Commodore 64 games
Commodore 64-only games
Shoot 'em ups
Video games set in Washington, D.C.
Video games developed in the United States